The 1953 Norwegian Football Cup was the 48th season of the Norwegian annual knockout football tournament. The tournament was open for all members of NFF, except those from Northern Norway. The final was played at Ullevaal Stadion in Oslo on 25 October 1953, and was contested by Lillestrøm, who made their first appearance in the cup final and Viking, who had lost the cup final on two previous occasions (1933 and 1947). Viking secured their first title with a 2–1 win in the final. Sparta was the defending champions, but was eliminated by Stavanger in the fourth round.

First round

|-
|colspan="3" style="background-color:#97DEFF"|Replay

|}

Second round

|-
|colspan="3" style="background-color:#97DEFF"|Replay

|}

Third round

|colspan="3" style="background-color:#97DEFF"|9 August 1953

|}

Fourth round

|colspan="3" style="background-color:#97DEFF"|23 August 1953

|-
|colspan="3" style="background-color:#97DEFF"|Replay: 30 August 1953

|-
|colspan="3" style="background-color:#97DEFF"|Replay: 6 September 1953

|}

Quarter-finals

|colspan="3" style="background-color:#97DEFF"|20 September 1953

|}

Semi-finals

|colspan="3" style="background-color:#97DEFF"|11 October 1953

|-
|colspan="3" style="background-color:#97DEFF"|Replay: 18 October 1953

|}

Final

See also
1952–53 Norwegian Main League
1953 in Norwegian football

References

Norwegian Football Cup seasons
Norway
Cup